Qianchang railway station is a railway station located in Guankou Town, Jimei District, Xiamen City,  Fujian Province, China, on the Xiamen-Shenzhen Railway operated by the Nanchang Railway Bureau, China Railway Corporation.

Service
Currently the station only operates freight trains (and no passenger trains).

References 

Railway stations in Fujian